Kpwe or Kwe may be:
Kpwe people
Kpwe language